Lebanon competed at the 2017 World Championships in Athletics in London, United Kingdom, from 4–13 August 2017.

Results
(q – qualified, NM – no mark, SB – season best)

Men
Track and road events

References

Nations at the 2017 World Championships in Athletics
World Championships in Athletics
Lebanon at the World Championships in Athletics